In 2008–09, FC Barcelona started a new era with a new manager, former captain and Barcelona B coach Pep Guardiola, who led the team to the first treble in Spanish football history. After selling off high-profiled players such as Deco and Ronaldinho, Barcelona played scintillating football throughout the season, winning the Copa del Rey, La Liga, and the UEFA Champions League. Guardiola‘s 2008-09 Barcelona is widely considered to be one of the best teams of all time.

Pre-season

Source : FC Barcelona

Players

Squad information

Players in and out

In

Total spending:   €88M

Out

Total income:   €49.5M
{|

Squad stats

Disciplinary record

Club

Coaching staff

Competitions

Overall
As in nine out of the last ten seasons, Barcelona was present in all major competitions. First division and Copa del Rey in Spain and UEFA Champions League in Europe.

La Liga

League table

Results summary

Results by round

Matches
All kickoff times are in CEST.

Copa del Rey

Round of 32

Round of 16

Quarter-finals

Semi-finals

Final

UEFA Champions League

Third qualifying round

Group stage

Knockout phase

Round of 16

Quarter-finals

Semi-finals

Final

Record

References

External links
 FC Barcelona official website
 English Speaking FC Barcelona Supporters
 ESPNsoccernet: Barcelona Team Page
 Footballdatabase.com: FC Barcelona (Spain) profile
 UEFA Champions League
 Web Oficial de la Liga de Fútbol Profesional
 Federació Catalana de Futbol 

Barcelona
2008-09
2008-09
2008-09